The World Allround Speed Skating Championships for Men took place on 12 and 13 February 1977 in Heerenveen at the Thialf ice rink.

Classification

  * = Fell
  DQ = Disqualified

Source:

References

Attribution
In Dutch
World Allround Speed Skating Championships, 1977
1977 World Allround